The Royal Road was an ancient Persian highway.

Royal Road may also refer to:
 Royal Road, Kraków, Poland
 The Royal Road, a 2015 documentary film

See also
 Royal Road to Card Magic, a 1948 book by Jean Hugard and Frederick Braue
 IV△7–V7–iii7–vi progression, also known as the royal road chord progression
 Great Royal Road of the ancient Mauryan Empire, in what is now Pakistan
 King's Highway (disambiguation)
 King's Way
 Royal Roads, a roadstead in Canada
 Royal Route, Warsaw
 El Camino Real (Spanish)
 Estrada Real (Portuguese)
 Rue Royale (French)
 Via Regia (Latin)